Erich Auer (14 April 1923 – 17 December 2004) was an Austrian theater, film and television actor. He had leading roles in several heimatfilmen during the early 1950s. He was married to Martha Wallner, a popular Austrian actress. They had two children, Marieluise and Erich Auer.

Selected filmography
 Duel with Death (1949)
 The Fourth Commandment (1950)
 The Merry Farmer (1951)
 Spring on Ice (1951)
 The Crucifix Carver of Ammergau (1952)
 The Monastery's Hunter (1953)
 Marriage Strike (1953)
 Ten on Every Finger (1954)
 The First Kiss (1954)
Das Mädchen vom Pfarrhof (1955)
 The King of Bernina (1957)

References

Bibliography
 Goble, Alan. The Complete Index to Literary Sources in Film. Walter de Gruyter, 1999.

External links

1923 births
2004 deaths
Austrian male television actors
Austrian male film actors
Male actors from Vienna